The  was a feudal domain of Japan in the Edo period. Located in what is now Mihara City, Hiroshima Prefecture, it encompassed the southern part of Bingo Province. Its headquarter was Mihara Castle (三原城 Mihara-jō). At its peak, it was rated at 30,000 koku. For more than two hundred years the daimyō of Mihara were a collateral branch of the Asano clan who held Hiroshima Domain. It was a subordinate of Hiroshima Domain where the main line of the Asano clan ruled from.

History 
Mihara Castle was built 1567 by Kobayakawa Takakage, the third son of the famous warlord Mōri Motonari who controlled most of Aki and Bingo Provinces. It was a large scale castle with 3 baileys, 32 sumi yagura (corner towers), and 14 mon (gates). It was built on the coast and connected two islands giving rise to the nickname Ukishirō or "floating castle." Kobayakawa Takakage moved from Niitakayama Castle (新高山城), a typical mountaintop castle, to this site to better manage the Mōri clan's naval forces and to help protect from Oda Nobunaga who was advancing from the east.

Kobayakawa Takakage took part in the Japanese invasions of Korea (1592–98) and adopted Kobayakawa Hideaki who was the adopted son of Toyotomi Hideyoshi. After the battle of the Battle of Sekigahara in 1600, Hideaki who had helped Tokugawa Ieyasu gain control of the country was awarded with the defeated Ukita clan's former fiefdoms of Bizen and Mimasaka, for a total of 550,000 koku.

The shōgun, Tokugawa Ieyasu, transferred Fukushima Masanori who was formerly the ruler of Kiyosu Castle to Hiroshima Castle of the Hiroshima Domain and his adopted son Fukushima Masayuki became lord of the Mihara Domain from Mihara Castle. Shortly afterwards the Fukushima clan lost favor with the shōgun when Fukushima Masanori made repairs to Hiroshima Castle which was prohibited by law. This resulted in the Fukushima clan being replaced by the Asano clan who would rule the domains of Hiroshima, Mihara, Yoshida and Ako until the Meiji Restoration.

The tenshu foundation of Mihara Castle was the largest ever built, similar in size to that of Edo Castle, but the main keep was never actually built. The castle escaped demolition during the Meiji period so that it could be used as Imperial naval base. It was later decommissioned and Mihara Train Station was built on the site in 1894. At this time all the buildings were destroyed and much of the stone walls torn down. The honmaru was further cut to make way for the bullet train in 1975. Together with Kobayakawa's Niitakayama Castle (新高山城) it is designated a National Historic Site.

List of Daimyō

Retainers (家臣) 

 
 
 
 
 , descendants of Hayashi Narinaga.

Notes

References 
 The New Official Guide: Japan. University of California, Japan Travel Bureau (1975).
 Schmorleitz, Morton S., (1974). Castles in Japan. University of Michigan: C. E. Tuttle Co.

See also
Mihara Castle
Hiroshima Domain
Han system
List of Han
Asano clan

External links
 Mihara Castle | JapanVisitor Japan Travel Guide
 Japanese Castle Explorer – Mihara Castle – 三原城
 Mihara Castle – Jcastle

Domains of Japan
States and territories established in 1567
History of Hiroshima Prefecture
Tokugawa clan